The Amy Lowell Poetry Travelling Scholarship is given annually to a U.S.-born poet to spend one year outside North America in a country the recipient feels will most advance his or her work.

When poet Amy Lowell died in 1925, her will established the scholarship, which is administered by the trustees at the law firm of Choate, Hall & Stewart in Boston, Massachusetts.

Winners

 1953–1954 E. L. Mayo
 1954–1955 Stanley Kunitz
 1955–1956 Joseph Langland 
 1956–1957 William Alfred 
 1957–1958 Elizabeth Bishop 
 1958–1959 Kenneth Rexroth
 1959–1960 May Swenson
 1960–1961 Judson Jerome 
 1961–1962 Adrienne Rich Conrad
 1962–1963 Byron Vazakas 
 1963–1964 Miller Williams 
 1964–1965 Robert Bly 
 1965–1966 Thomas McGrath 
 1966–1967 Robert Grenier 
 1967–1968 Robert Francis 
 1968–1969 Edwin Honig
 1969–1970 Galway Kinnell 
 1970–1971 Keith Waldrop 
 1971–1972 Michael Wolfe
 1972–1973  Robert Peterson
 1973–1974 Kenneth O. Hanson 
 1974–1975 Rika Lesser
 1975–1976 Jonathan Aaron
 1976–1977 John Haines 
 1977–1978 Lynn Sukenick
 1978–1979 Edward Hirsch 
 1979–1980 Norman Williams 
 1980–1981 William Logan
 1981–1982 Brad Leithauser 
 1982–1983 Debora Greger 
 1983–1984 Nicholas Christopher (resigned) 
 1984–1985 Gjertrud Schnackenberg 
 1985–1986 Nicholas Christopher 
 1986–1987 Elizabeth Spires 
 1987–1988 David Wojahn 
 1988–1989 Jeffrey Harrison 
 1989–1990 Henri Cole 
 1990–1991 Richard Tillinghast 
 1991–1992 Sharon M. Van Sluys 
 1992–1993 Daniel J. Hall
 1993–1994 John Drexel 
 1994–1995 Reginald Shepherd (resigned) 
 1995–1996 Mary Jo Salter
 1996–1997 Craig Arnold
 1997–1998 Caroline Finkelstein
 1998–1999 Elizabeth Macklin
 1999–2000 Phillis Levin
 2000–2001 Richard Foerster
 2001–2002 Nick Flynn
 2002–2003 Rick Hilles
 2003–2004 Mark Wunderlich
 2004–2005 Mary Jane Nealon 
 2005–2006 Geri Doran
 2006–2007 James Arthur
 2007–2008 David Roderick
 2008–2009 Kathleen Graber
 2009–2010 Brian Turner
 2010–2011 Paula Bohince, Elizabeth Arnold
 2011–2012 Paisley Rekdal, Mark Spencer Reece
 2012–2013 Joshua Weiner, Penelope Pelizzon
 2013–2014 CJ Evans, Rebecca Lindenberg
 2014–2015 Sam Taylor
 2015–2016 Meg Day
 2018–2019 Molly McCully Brown

See also
American poetry
List of poetry awards
List of literary awards
List of years in poetry
List of years in literature

Notes

External links
 Amy Lowell Poetry Travelling Scholarship Web site

American poetry awards